{{Infobox company
| name = Northern Light Group, LLC
| former_names = Northern Light Technology, LLC
| type = Private
| company_slogan = Unknown
| foundation = 1996
| location = Cambridge, Massachusetts, USA
| industry = Technology
| products = Web search (early)Enterprise searchResearch portals
| brands = SinglePoint
| key_people = 
| homepage = 
| num_employees = 55+
}}Northern Light Group, LLC' is an American technology company that specializes in enterprise search technology, text analytics solutions and research engines that combine traditional search engine functions with access to non-web based publications. The company provides custom, hosted turnkey solutions for its clients using the software as a service (SAS) delivery model. 

Northern Light markets its research portals under the trade name SinglePoint. Typical applications for SinglePoint research portals are in market research, competitive intelligence, product management, product development, and technologic research. Northern Light's client base consists of global companies that typically have more than $10 billion in annual sales. Companies that have stated publicly that they use SinglePoint research portals from Northern Light include HP, Verizon, Symantec, SAP, and Cisco.

Northern Light has been selected for six years in a row (as of 2009) as one of the "100 Companies That Matter In Knowledge Management" by KMWorld magazine.

According to the industry trade magazine Information Today, Northern Light is innovating the automated analysis and extraction of meaning from large repositories of market intelligence documents.

History
The company is named after the clipper ship Northern Light'', which held the speed record for the San Francisco to Boston voyage for nearly 150 years.

From its founding in 1996 until January 2002, Northern Light operated a Web search engine for public use, originally on the domain nlsearch.com. It was regarded at the time as innovative in provision of search based on classification and inclusion of both public and proprietary information resources. During this time period, Northern Light also developed private custom search engines for large corporate clients marketed under the trade name SinglePoint.  

In 2002, after immediate public backlash against the sudden monetization of their formerly public search engine, Northern Light discontinued it. With their market value in tatters, they were easily acquired by Divine, Inc., an enterprise software company. In 2003, an employee group bought the company from its parent and it is still employee-owned as of 2010 and SinglePoint is its main product line.

In 2000, the company was the title sponsor for the IndyCar Series.

References

Internet search engines
Companies based in Cambridge, Massachusetts
Search engines